Sergei Yuryevich Bozhko (- Serhiy Yuriyovych Bozhko; born 3 March 1973) is a former Russian professional footballer. He also holds Ukrainian citizenship.

Club career
He made his professional debut in the Soviet Second League in 1991 for FC Zorya Luhansk.

References

External links

1973 births
People from Lyman, Ukraine
Living people
Soviet footballers
Russian footballers
Association football forwards
Association football midfielders
FC Zorya Luhansk players
FC Zhemchuzhina Sochi players
FC Ilves players
FC Lokomotiv Nizhny Novgorod players
FC Stal Alchevsk players
FC Stal-2 Alchevsk players
FC Akhmat Grozny players
FC Naftovyk-Ukrnafta Okhtyrka players
Russian Premier League players
Ukrainian Premier League players
Ukrainian First League players
Veikkausliiga players
Russian expatriate footballers
Expatriate footballers in Finland